The International Messianic Jewish Alliance is an umbrella organization for various national Messianic Jewish organizations. Founded in 1925,  it has 16 member organizations.

References

External links 
International Messianic Jewish Alliance

Christian denominations established in the 20th century
Conversion of Jews to Christianity
Messianic Judaism
Christian organizations established in 1925